Antonio G. Olivieri (June 12, 1941 – November 4, 1980) was an American politician who served in the New York State Assembly from the 66th district from 1971 to 1974 and in the New York City Council from the Manhattan at-large district from 1978 to 1980.

He died of cancer on November 4, 1980, in Manhattan, New York City, New York at age 39.

Personal life 
Oliveri married Frances Gallatin Reese on June 28, 1964.

He died at home of a malignant brain tumor on November 4, 1980.

References

1941 births
1980 deaths
Democratic Party members of the New York State Assembly
New York City Council members
20th-century American politicians